Nurbakyt Tengizbayev (born 10 April 1983 in Usharal, Kazakhstan) is a Kazakh wrestler who won the Bronze medal in the Men's Greco-Roman 60 kg in the 2008 Summer Olympics in Beijing.

References

External links
 

Living people
Olympic bronze medalists for Kazakhstan
Olympic wrestlers of Kazakhstan
Wrestlers at the 2004 Summer Olympics
Wrestlers at the 2008 Summer Olympics
Olympic medalists in wrestling
Wrestlers at the 2006 Asian Games
Wrestlers at the 2010 Asian Games
Medalists at the 2008 Summer Olympics
World Wrestling Championships medalists
Kazakhstani male sport wrestlers
Asian Games competitors for Kazakhstan
21st-century Kazakhstani people
20th-century Kazakhstani people
1983 births